Alejandro Ezequiel Rivero (born 12 June 1998) is an Argentine professional footballer who plays as a goalkeeper for Dock Sud, on loan from Arsenal de Sarandí.

Career
Rivero is a product of the Arsenal de Sarandí youth system. He was initially promoted into their first-team squad in May 2018, as he appeared on the substitute's bench for a total of four matches; including for Copa Sudamericana second stage fixtures with Sport Recife. A return to the reserves and a first pro contract soon followed, before the goalkeeper was moved back into the senior set-up towards the end of 2020. After appearing on the bench nine times across November and December, Rivero made his professional debut on 3 January 2021 in a Copa de la Liga Profesional encounter away to Independiente. In June 2022, Rivero was loaned out to Primera B Metropolitana side Dock Sud until the end of the year.

Career statistics
.

Notes

References

External links

1998 births
Living people
People from Quilmes
Argentine footballers
Association football goalkeepers
Argentine Primera División players
Primera B Metropolitana players
Sportivo Dock Sud players
Sportspeople from Buenos Aires Province